The All India Institute of Ayurveda, Delhi (abbreviated AIIA Delhi or AIIA) is a public Ayurveda medicine and research institution located in New Delhi, India.

History
The proposal for the establishment of AIIA at New Delhi originated from then-Prime Minister Atal Bihari Vajpayee's declaration to establish a state-of-the-art National Ayurveda Hospital at the ceremony of Vaidya Ram Narayan Sharma Memorial Award Distribution on 5 May 2000, under the aegis of All India Ayurveda Congress.

The cornerstone of the institute was laid in 2007 upon approval of the Finance Ministry in 2003. The Government of India recommended the proposal to develop the institute focused on R&D, safety evaluation, and quality standards of Ayurveda medicines. The institute has been providing out-patient services since 2009. In 2014, the Government of India established the Ministry of Ayush and AIIA Delhi, an autonomous institute under the Ministry of AYUSH. AIIA was first inaugurated in October 2010. Prime Minister of India, Narendra Modi, inaugurated the Institute for a second time in 2017.

AIIA is the publisher of the Journal of Ayurveda Case Reports (AyuCaRe), a quarterly peer-reviewed journal.

See also  

 Institute of Teaching and Research in Ayurveda
 National Institute of Ayurveda
 National Research Institute for Panchakarma

References

External links
 AIIA Website

Ayurvedic colleges in Delhi
Research institutes in India
Educational institutions established in 2016
2016 establishments in Delhi
Ministry of AYUSH
Modi administration